Sarcolaena eriophora is a species of plant in the Sarcolaenaceae family. It is endemic to Madagascar.  Its natural habitats are subtropical or tropical moist lowland forests and sandy shores. It is threatened by habitat loss.

References

Endemic flora of Madagascar
eriophora
Least concern plants
Taxonomy articles created by Polbot